David Lamai (born 22 April 1964) is a Kenyan athlete. He competed in the men's long jump at the 1988 Summer Olympics.

References

1964 births
Living people
Athletes (track and field) at the 1988 Summer Olympics
Kenyan male long jumpers
Olympic athletes of Kenya
Place of birth missing (living people)